Mecklenburg County Courthouse is a historic courthouse building located at Boydton, Mecklenburg County, Virginia. It was built in 1838–1842, and is a large two-story,  Roman Revival brick temple-form structure.  It is five-bays wide and five-bays deep and features a hexastyle Ionic order portico.  The building has a two-story rear ell.

It was listed on the National Register of Historic Places in 1975.  It is located in the Boydton Historic District.

References

Courthouses on the National Register of Historic Places in Virginia
County courthouses in Virginia
Government buildings completed in 1842
Buildings and structures in Mecklenburg County, Virginia
National Register of Historic Places in Mecklenburg County, Virginia
Individually listed contributing properties to historic districts on the National Register in Virginia
1842 establishments in Virginia